Tryon may refer to:

 Tryon (surname)

Places 
 Tryon Creek, tributary of the Willamette River in Oregon
 Tryon Street, major north-south street of Charlotte, North Carolina
 Tryon, Prince Edward Island, Canada, unincorporated area
 Settled communities:
 Tryon, North Carolina, town
 Tryon, Oklahoma, town
 Unincorporated communities:
 Tryon, Nebraska
 Tryon, Gaston County, North Carolina
 Defunct counties:
Tryon County, New York 
 Tryon County, North Carolina

Other uses
 USS Tryon (APH-1), US Navy medical evacuation transport named for James R. Tryon

See also
 Tyron, a given name